The Album is the fifth studio album by American country music artist Chase Rice. It was released on May 28, 2021 via Broken Bow Records and Dack Janiels Records.

Content 
An EP entitled The Album, Pt. I was released on January 24, 2020, which consisted of the album's first seven tracks, including its lead single "Lonely If You Are". A second EP, The Album, Pt. II, was released on May 15, 2020 and included the next four tracks. The last four tracks, including the album's second single "Drinkin' Beer. Talkin' God. Amen.", were released with the rest of the full album on May 28, 2021. Rice co-wrote eleven of the album's fifteen tracks.

Critical reception 
Will Carter of Rock n' Load Magazine wrote a generally favorable review of the album upon release. While criticizing the album for its country pop sound, he wrote that the album is an "excellent release and will surely please Chase’s legions of fans and certainly win him more."

Commercial performance 
The Album peaked at number 34 on both the Billboard Top Country Albums and Independent Albums charts.

Track listing 
Adapted from album credits.

Personnel 
Adapted from The Album liner notes.

Musicians 
 Chase Rice – lead and background vocals, acoustic guitar, dobro
 Naomi Cooke – background vocals
 Martin Johnson – background vocals
 Brandon Paddock – background vocals
 Dan Johnson – background vocals
 Linda McKernan – background vocals
 Mark Noel – background vocals
 Russell Terrell – background vocals
 Jordan Minton – background vocals
 Taela Lacour – background vocals
 Kiley Dean – background vocals
 Jonny Fung – electric guitar, programming
 Zach Kale – background vocals, electric guitar, keys, programming
 Rob McNelley – electric guitar
 Tyler Tomlinson – electric guitar
 Ryan Barnette – electric guitar
 Jimmy Robbins – acoustic guitar, programming, keyboards, bass
 Jonathan Singleton – background vocals, electric guitar, banjo
 Derek Wells – electric guitar, steel guitar
 Alex Wright – keys, B3, piano, synth, Wurlitzer
 Chris DeStefano – background vocals, synth, bass, keys, programming, electric guitar, acoustic guitar, live bass, dobro, piano, banjo, keyboards, drums, drum programming
 Miles McPherson – drums, percussion
 Tony Lucido – bass
 Charlie Judge – keys, piano, programming
 Ilya Toshinskiy – acoustic guitar, dobro, electric guitar, banjo
 Justin Ostrander – electric guitar
 Tyler Chiarelli – guitar
 Corey Crowder – background vocals, acoustic guitar, programming
 Todd Lombardo – acoustic guitar, banjo, high strung guitar, Resonator
 Jerry Roe – drums, percussion
 Casey Brown – background vocals, keys, electric guitar, programming, acoustic guitar

Technical 
 Chase Rice – producer (all tracks except 1, 3, 7, and 12-14)
 Chris DeStefano – producer (all tracks except 1, 3, 7, and 12-15), recording, digital editing
 Martin Johnson – producer, sound production (track 1)
 Brandon Paddock – producer, sound production (track 1)
 Zach Kale – producer (tracks 3 and 12), recording, digital editing
 Casey Brown – producer (track 7)
 Corey Crowder – producer (tracks 13 and 15), recording, digital editing
 Jimmy Robbins – producer (track 14), recording, digital editing
 Jonathan Singleton – producer (track 14), recording
 Tyler Hubbard – producer (track 15)
 Brian Kelley – producer (track 15)
 Pete Lyman – mastering (all tracks except 13 and 15)
 Adam Ayan – mastering (tracks 13 and 15)
 Bryce Roberts – assistant engineer
 Josh Ditty – assistant engineer, digital editing
 David Cook – digital editing
 Miles McPherson – digital editing
 Chris Small – vocal editing engineer
 Alyson McAnally – production coordinator
 Scott Johnson – production coordinator
 Kelsey Granda – production coordinator

Charts

Weekly charts

Year-end charts

Release history

References 

2021 albums
Chase Rice albums
BBR Music Group albums